Afrarpia is a genus of moths of the family Crambidae. It contains only one species, Afrarpia mariepsiensis, which is found in South Africa.

References

Scopariinae
Crambidae genera